Sergei Viktorovich Samsonov (Sergej Viktorovič Samsonov; born October 27, 1978) is a Russian former professional ice hockey forward who is now a scout for the Carolina Hurricanes.

Playing career
As a youth, Samsonov played in the 1992 Quebec International Pee-Wee Hockey Tournament with a team from Moscow.

Samsonov was drafted by the Boston Bruins eighth overall in the 1997 NHL Entry Draft. Boston drafted Joe Thornton first overall in the same draft. In his rookie year, Samsonov won the Calder Memorial Trophy as the league's best rookie after scoring 22 goals and a total of 47 points. In the 2000–01 season, he played in his only NHL All-Star Game in Denver.

Before playing in the NHL, Samsonov represented Russia in 1996 and 1997 at the World Junior Hockey Championships. He led the 1997 Russian team to a bronze medal and was named the tournament's most outstanding forward after scoring six goals in six games. He later played for Russia in 2002 at the Winter Olympics in Salt Lake City, earning a bronze medal.

In his early career, Samsonov was a highly touted prospect as the next future star of international hockey as he wowed fans and scouts alike with his shifty turns and scoring prowess. Samsonov scored 110 goals in 50 games with the Red Army junior team in 1994–95. That was prior to moving up to the Elite team later that season. He had 23 goals, 19 assists for a total of 42 points with 26 PIM in 64 career games with the Red Army elite team. In 1996–97, he played for the Detroit Vipers of the International Hockey League, and won the Garry F. Longman Memorial Trophy as the league's Rookie of the Year. He also won the league championship, the Turner Cup, with the Vipers. Samsonov is the only player in history to ever win the rookie of the year award for the IHL and the NHL in back-to-back seasons.

Samsonov scored his first NHL goal on October 25, 1997.  It occurred in Boston's 5-4 loss to the Florida Panthers.

On March 9, 2006, Samsonov was traded from Boston to the Edmonton Oilers for Marty Reasoner, Yan Stastny, and a second-round pick in the 2006 NHL entry draft (Milan Lucic). He was part of the Oilers team that made it to the 2006 Stanley Cup Final.

On July 12, 2006, Samsonov signed with the Montreal Canadiens for a two-year contract worth $7.05 million. Through a lackluster season, the Canadiens placed Samsonov on waivers in February 2007, and traded him to the Chicago Blackhawks for Jassen Cullimore and Tony Salmelainen in June 2007.

On January 3, 2008, the Blackhawks assigned Samsonov to the Rockford IceHogs of the American Hockey League (AHL) after he cleared waivers.

On January 8, 2008, the Carolina Hurricanes claimed Samsonov off re-entry waivers. He recorded his first point as a Hurricane on January 12, 2008, against the Colorado Avalanche and scored his first goal three days later in a three-point game against the Toronto Maple Leafs.

On April 16, 2008, the Hurricanes announced that they had reached an agreement with Samsonov for a three-year contract worth $7.6 million. The deal paid Samsonov $2.3 million in 2008–09, $2.5 million in 2009–10 and $2.8 million in 2010–11.

At the 2011 trade deadline, Samsonov was traded to the Florida Panthers, where he played 20 games.

In 2014 Samsonov became a scout for the Carolina Hurricanes  and in 2017 they hired him to train their forwards.

Career statistics

Regular season and playoffs

International

References

External links 

1978 births
Living people
Boston Bruins draft picks
Boston Bruins players
Calder Trophy winners
Carolina Hurricanes coaches
Carolina Hurricanes players
Carolina Hurricanes scouts
Chicago Blackhawks players
Detroit Vipers players
Edmonton Oilers players
Florida Panthers players
HC CSKA Moscow players
HC Dynamo Moscow players
Ice hockey players at the 2002 Winter Olympics
Medalists at the 2002 Winter Olympics
Montreal Canadiens players
National Hockey League All-Stars
National Hockey League first-round draft picks
Olympic bronze medalists for Russia
Olympic ice hockey players of Russia
Olympic medalists in ice hockey
Rockford IceHogs (AHL) players
Russian ice hockey left wingers
Ice hockey people from Moscow